Shirley Clarke (born 21 January 1977) is a Barbadian cricketer. He played in twelve first-class and five List A matches for Barbados and Combined Campuses and Colleges from 1999 to 2008.

He is a Level 3 coach and coached his son Kyle Mayers.

See also
 List of Barbadian representative cricketers

References

External links
 

1977 births
Living people
Barbadian cricketers
Barbados cricketers
Combined Campuses and Colleges cricketers
People from Saint James, Barbados